"Resistance" is a song by English alternative rock band Muse, featured as the title track on their fifth studio album The Resistance. Written by vocalist, guitarist and pianist Matthew Bellamy, it was released as the third single from the album, following "Uprising" and "Undisclosed Desires", on 22 February 2010. The song makes several references to the novel Nineteen Eighty-Four, by George Orwell. The intro of the song is used in the trailer of the last episode of BBC show Silent Witness. In February 2010, Muse had uploaded a picture puzzle of "Resistance" artwork on their official Facebook page. The puzzle itself has a making of the "Resistance" track (which will be able to see it after solving the puzzle). This song was featured in a promo for an episode of Human Target.  The song was also released as downloadable content for the music video game Guitar Hero: Warriors of Rock.

Music video
The music video for "Resistance", which features footage of the band performing live on The Resistance Tour, debuted on 14 January 2010, and was directed by Wayne Isham in Madrid (Palacio de los Deportes, 28-November-2009).

Reception
"Resistance" reached number 35 in the Triple J Hottest 100, 2009. On 22 February 2010, "Resistance" debuted at number 17 on the Hot30 Countdown. On 26 March 2010, "Resistance" debuted at number 20 on the VH1 Top 20 Video Countdown, peaking at number 9.

The song was nominated at the 53rd Grammy Awards in two categories: Best Rock Performance by a Duo or Group with Vocal and Best Rock Song.  It lost in both categories to Neil Young's "Angry World", and The Black Keys' "Tighten Up", respectively. In 2011, Croatian group 2Cellos covered this song as a cello duet.

"Resistance" was played frequently in concert by Muse. The song was played at most shows during The Resistance Tour, was played frequently during The 2nd Law Tour, and on rarer occasions during the Drones World Tour. A live version of "Resistance" was included on Live at Rome Olympic Stadium.

Track listing

Charts

Commercial performance
On 21 February 2010, "Resistance" entered the UK Rock Chart at number two. Following from its success on the Rock Chart, on 28 February 2010, the single entered the UK Singles Chart as a new entry at number 38, beating previous single: "Undisclosed Desires", which only peaked at number 49. "Resistance" is now the second Top 40 hit from The Resistance. The same week resulted in "Resistance" climbing to the number one spot on the UK Rock Chart, as well. On the week of 20 March, it jumped from number six to number one on the Billboard Alternative Rock Chart and it became their second number one single on the chart along with their previous single "Uprising".

Weekly charts

See also
List of number-one alternative rock singles of 2010 (U.S.)
List of number-one rock hits of 2010 (UK)

References

External links
 

Muse (band) songs
2010 singles
2009 songs
2000s ballads
Rock ballads
Songs written by Matt Bellamy
Music based on Nineteen Eighty-Four
Music videos directed by Wayne Isham